Iida Maria Vemmelpuu (till 1906 Wilenius; 10 February 1868, Kangasala – 3 August 1924) was a Finnish schoolteacher and politician. She was a member of the Parliament of Finland from 1907 to 1909, representing the Finnish Party.

References

1868 births
1924 deaths
People from Kangasala
People from Häme Province (Grand Duchy of Finland)
Finnish Party politicians
Members of the Parliament of Finland (1907–08)
Members of the Parliament of Finland (1908–09)
Finnish schoolteachers
Women members of the Parliament of Finland
20th-century Finnish women politicians